This article is a collection of statewide public opinion polls that have been conducted relating to the 2008 Republican Party presidential primaries, typically using standard statistical methodology.

Candidates

The known candidates with national campaigns are John McCain, and Ron Paul, and Withdrawn candidates include Jim Gilmore, Tommy Thompson, Sam Brownback, John H. Cox, Tom Tancredo, Duncan Hunter, Fred Thompson, Rudy Giuliani, Alan Keyes and Mitt Romney. Candidates who declined to seek the nomination include George Allen, Jeb Bush, Dick Cheney, Bill Frist, Newt Gingrich, Chuck Hagel, Condoleezza Rice, Mark Sanford, and Rick Santorum.  One candidate included in some polls who said nothing either way, and did not enter the race is George Pataki.

On March 4, 2008, John McCain crossed the delegate threshold and became the presumptive nominee of the GOP in the 2008 election. It is mathematically impossible for Mike Huckabee or Ron Paul, the two remaining candidates on the ballot, to meet or exceed the number of McCain's pledged delegates.

Polling

Alabama
Alabama Winner Mike Huckabee
Primary Date February 5, 2008See also

Alaska
Alaska Winner: Mitt Romney
Primary Date February 5, 2008

Arizona
Arizona Winner John McCain
Primary Date February 5, 2008See also

Arkansas
Arkansas Winner Mike Huckabee
Primary Date February 5, 2008See also

California
California Winner John McCain
Primary Date February 5, 2008
See also

Colorado
Colorado Winner Mitt Romney
Caucus Date February 5, 2008See also

Connecticut
Connecticut Winner John McCain
Primary Date February 5, 2008See also

Delaware
Delaware Winner John McCain
Primary Date February 5, 2008

District of Columbia
District of Columbia Winner John McCain
Primary Date February 12, 2008

Florida
Florida Winner John McCain
Primary Date January 29, 2008

See also

Georgia
Georgia Winner Mike Huckabee
Primary Date February 5, 2008See also

Idaho
Idaho Winner John McCain
Primary Date May 27, 2008

Illinois
Illinois Winner John McCain
Primary Date February 5, 2008See also

Iowa
Iowa Winner Mike Huckabee
Caucus Date January 3, 2008

See also

Kansas
Kansas Winner Mike Huckabee
Caucus Date February 9, 2008

Louisiana
Louisiana Winner Mike Huckabee
Primary Date February 9, 2008

Maine
Maine Winner: Mitt Romney 
Caucus Dates: February 1–3, 2008See also

Maryland
Maryland Winner John McCain
Primary Date February 12, 2008

Massachusetts
Massachusetts Winner Mitt Romney
Primary Date February 5, 2008See also

Michigan
Michigan Winner Mitt Romney
Primary Date January 15, 2008

See also

Minnesota
Minnesota Winner Mitt Romney
Caucus Date February 5, 2008

Missouri
Missouri Winner John McCain
Primary Date February 5, 2008See also

Montana
Montana Winner Mitt Romney
Caucus Date February 5, 2008

Nevada
Nevada Winner Mitt Romney
Caucus Date January 19, 2008

See also

New Hampshire
New Hampshire Winner John McCain
Primary Date January 8, 2008

See also

New Jersey
New Jersey Winner John McCain
Primary Date February 5, 2008
See also

New Mexico
New Mexico Winner John McCain
Primary Date June 3, 2008See also

New York
New York Winner John McCain
Primary Date February 5, 2008

See also

North Carolina
North Carolina Winner John McCain
Primary Date May 6, 2008See also

North Dakota
 North Dakota Winner Mitt Romney
Caucus Date February 5, 2008

Ohio
Ohio Winner John McCain
Primary Date March 4, 2008
See also

Oklahoma
Oklahoma Winner John McCain
Primary Date February 5, 2008See also

Oregon
Oregon Winner: To Be Determined
Primary Date May 20, 2008

Pennsylvania
Pennsylvania Winner John McCain
Primary Date Tuesday, April 22, 2008
See also

Rhode Island
Rhode Island Winner John McCain
Primary Date March 4, 2008See also

South Carolina
South Carolina Winner John McCain
Primary Date January 19, 2008

See also

Tennessee
Tennessee Winner Mike Huckabee
Primary Date February 5, 2008

Texas
Texas Winner John McCain
Primary Date March 4, 2008See also

Utah
Utah Winner Mitt Romney
Primary Date February 5, 2008See also

Vermont
Vermont Winner John McCain
Primary Date March 4, 2008See also

Virginia
Virginia Winner John McCain
Primary Date February 12, 2008

Washington
Washington Winner John McCain
Caucus Date February 9, 2008
See also

West Virginia
West Virginia Winner Mike Huckabee
Caucus Date February 5, 2008
Primary Date May 13, 2008See also

Wisconsin
Wisconsin Winner John McCain
Primary Date February 19, 2008
See also

Wyoming
Wyoming Winner Mitt Romney
Caucus Date January 5, 2008

Notes
Strategic Vision is suspected of forging results.

Summary
Sources: National Association of Secretaries of State
Using RCP averages when available

Current leaders
The race for the Republican nomination is decided upon how many delegates a candidate receives. In this section we see how many pledged delegates each candidate has received to date ranking from first place (the most delegates) to sixth place (the least delegates). To be nominated, a candidate must win an absolute majority of delegates, or 1,191 delegates.

First Place: John McCain with 12 states and 709 pledged delegates.
Alabama (16)
Alaska (3)
Arkansas (1)
Arizona (50)₩
California (116)₩
Connecticut (27)₩
Delaware (18)₩
Florida (57)₩
Georgia (3)
Illinois (54)₩
Iowa (3)
Massachusetts (17)
Michigan (5)
Missouri (58)₩
New Hampshire (7)₩
New Jersey (52)₩
New York (101)₩
Nevada (4)
Oklahoma (32)₩
North Dakota (5)
South Carolina (19)₩
Tennessee  (7)
Second Place: Mitt Romney with 11 states and 269 pledged delegates.
Alaska (12)₩
Arkansas (1)
California (3)
Colorado (22)₩
Illinois (2)
Iowa (12)
Maine (18) ₩
Massachusetts (21)₩
Michigan (24)₩
Minnesota (36)₩
Montana (25)₩
Nevada (18)₩
New Hampshire (4)
North Dakota (8)₩
Tennessee  (3)
Utah (36)₩
Wyoming (9)₩
Third Place:  Mike Huckabee with 6 states and 170 (167)*pledged delegates.
Alabama (20)₩
Alaska (6)
Arkansas (29)₩
Georgia (45)₩
Iowa (17)₩
New Hampshire (1)
Michigan (1)
Nevada (2)
North Dakota (5)
Oklahoma (6)
South Carolina (5)
Tennessee  (12)₩
West Virginia  (18/15)₩*
Fourth Place: Ron Paul with no states and 16 (19)*pledged delegates.
Alaska (5)
Iowa (2)
Nevada (4)
North Dakota (5)
West Virginia  (0/3)*

₩- Means the candidate has won that particular state

According to local news reports, three of Mike Huckabee's delegates from West Virginia were promised to Ron Paul in exchange for support for Huckabee from Paul's caucus supporters in West Virginia.

All information comes from

Predicted results
The numbers in parentheses indicate the number of convention delegates awarded to each state. A simple majority of delegate votes (1,191 out of 2,381) is needed to secure the nomination.

The number of convention delegates in Wyoming, New Hampshire, Michigan, South Carolina, and Florida have been cut in half due to scheduling their primary earlier than February 5.
Source

First place: John McCain with 26 states and 1390 delegates – projected nominee.
Arizona (53)₩
California (173)₩
Connecticut (30)₩
Delaware (18)₩
District of Columbia (19)₩
Florida (57)₩
Idaho (32)╬§
Illinois (70)₩
Maryland (37)₩
Missouri (58)₩
New Hampshire (12)₩
New Jersey (52)₩
New Mexico (32)╬§
New York (101)₩
Ohio (88)
Oklahoma (41)₩
Oregon (30)
North Carolina (69)
Pennsylvania (74)
Rhode Island (20)§
South Carolina (24)₩
Texas (140)
Vermont (17)†§
Virginia (63)₩
Washington (40)₩
Wisconsin (40)

Second place: Mike Huckabee with 8 states and 365 delegates
Alabama (48)₩
Arkansas (34)₩
Georgia (72)₩
Iowa (40)₩
Kansas (39)₩
Louisiana (47)₩
Tennessee (55)₩
West Virginia (30)₩

Third place: Mitt Romney with 11 states and 345 delegates
Alaska (29)₩
Colorado (46)₩
Maine (21)₩
Massachusetts (43)₩
Michigan (30)₩
Minnesota (41)₩
Montana (25)₩
Nevada (34)₩
North Dakota (26)₩
Utah (36)₩
Wyoming (14)₩

Notes
"†" indicates a lead within the margin of error or a tie.
"╬" indicates a state where the top candidate has withdrawn from the race since the latest poll was conducted, thus the next most-supported active candidate is granted that state's delegates.
"₩" indicates a state where the primary/caucus has been conducted and a winner has been declared.
"§" indicates a state where the latest poll was conducted before January 1, 2008

See also
Opinion polling for the Republican Party (United States) 2008 presidential candidates
Opinion polling for the Democratic Party (United States) presidential primaries, 2008

References

External links

Republican